William Sandell (born August 9, 1950) is an art director who was nominated at the 76th Academy Awards for his work on the film Master and Commander: The Far Side of the World in the category of Best Art Direction. He shared his nomination with Robert Gould .

He got his start on B-Movies such as Invasion of the Bee Girls.

In 2020 after regular appearances on Combat Radio, William launched his own radio show and podcast on Brigade-Radio-One called Art Scenic with Ethan Dettenmaier

Selected filmography

Invasion of the Bee Girls (1973)
Mean Streets (1973)
Big Bad Mama (1974)
Truck Turner (1974)
Checkered Flag or Crash (1977)
Fast Charlie... the Moonbeam Rider (1979)
Airplane II: The Sequel (1982)
RoboCop (1987)
Total Recall (1990)
Newsies (1992)
Hocus Pocus (1993)
The Flintstones (1994)
Air Force One (1997)
The Perfect Storm (2000)
Master and Commander: The Far Side of the World (2003)
Poseidon (2006)
Hotel for Dogs (2009)

References

External links

William's appearances on Combat Radio

1950 births
Living people
American art directors
Best Production Design BAFTA Award winners